Lukas Müllauer (born 3 July 1997) is an Austrian freestyle skier. He competed in the 2018 Winter Olympics.

References

1997 births
Living people
Freestyle skiers at the 2018 Winter Olympics
Austrian male freestyle skiers
Olympic freestyle skiers of Austria